Ding Dong Williams is a 1946 American comedy film directed by William Berke, and written by Brenda Weisberg and M. Coates Webster. The film stars Glen Vernon (under his real name, Glenn Vernon), Marcy McGuire, Felix Bressart, Anne Jeffreys, and James Warren. It was released on April 15, 1946 by RKO Radio Pictures.

Plot
Hollywood's Sunrise Studios is producing a film about a heartbroken composer who creates a modern rhapsody. The head of the music department, Hugo Meyerhold (Felix Bressart), and his young secretary Angela Jones (Marcy McGuire) engage jive clarinetist Ding Dong Williams (Glenn Vernon). However, Ding Dong's musical skills are limited to improvisation; he can't read or write music and just plays music the way he feels at the moment. Angela tries various schemes to induce Ding Dong to play something sad and soulful, including a fake romance with the studio's cowboy star, but all of her attempts fail. Ding Dong, dressed down by the studio boss and disillusioned by life in Hollywood, watches Meyerhold conducting pianist Richard Korbel and the studio orchestra playing Chopin's Fantaisie Impromptu. At the rear of the recording stage, the melancholy Ding Dong thoughtlessly begins to play a blue counterpoint to the orchestra. Angela sees this and has the director position a microphone above Ding Dong. The counterpoint melody is exactly what the studio boss wants, and all ends happily.

Cast
 Glen Vernon as Ding Dong Williams 
 Marcy McGuire as Miss Angela Jones
 Felix Bressart as Hugo Meyerhold
 Anne Jeffreys as Vanessa Page 
 James Warren as Steve Moore
 William B. Davidson as Mr. Saul Dana 
 Tommy Noonan as Zang 
 Cliff Nazarro as Zing
 Ruth Lee as Laura Cooper
 Jason Robards, Sr. as Director Kenmore 
 Bob Nolan as himself
 Sons of the Pioneers as themselves
 Tanis Chandler as Nightclub Hostess
 Robert Clarke as Nightclub Bandleader
 Constantin Bakaleinikoff as himself
 Richard Korbel as Piano Specialty

Production
Ding Dong Williams was based on a series of stories by Richard English, published in Collier's magazine, chronicling the comic adventures of a young musician. The movie version was filmed in 1945 as a vehicle for RKO's promising young star Glenn Vernon. The studio had cast Vernon opposite its resident rambunctious teenager Marcy McGuire in the B comedy Sing Your Way Home, and hoped to create in Vernon and McGuire a musical-comedy team like Mickey Rooney and Judy Garland. The working title of the new picture was Meet Ding Dong Williams, and the 62-minute B comedy was supposed to be the first in the series. Meanwhile, the studio had set the Leon Errol comedy Riverboat Rhythm as the next Vernon-McGuire picture. However, the temperamental McGuire saw the Errol script and resented the size of her role. She voiced her objections to her bosses, insisting that she be cast in leading musical roles. RKO responded by dismissing McGuire and canceling any plans for a series. The studio allowed talk of the new team to fade into memory, and kept the unreleased Ding Dong Williams on the shelf, but it was finally released in April 1946 to favorable reviews in Motion Picture Herald, Motion Picture Daily and Variety.

Although Ding Dong Williams never became a series, it did inspire a spinoff series. In Ding Dong Williams James Warren played a slow-witted movie cowboy with a palomino horse called Star Dust. RKO had been making Zane Grey westerns with Robert Mitchum in the leading roles, but with Mitchum advancing to dramatic features, Ding Dong Williams producer Herman Schlom remembered how well Warren had photographed in western gear. Warren took over the Zane Grey series, and because the unreleased Ding Dong Williams was still on the shelf, film audiences became familiar with Warren and Star Dust well before they had viewed Ding Dong Williams.

References

External links
 
 
 
 

1946 films
American black-and-white films
RKO Pictures films
Films directed by William A. Berke
American comedy films
1946 comedy films
1940s English-language films
1940s American films